Chlorotoluene is a group of three isomeric chemical compounds.  They (ortho-chlorotoluene, meta-chlorotoluene, and para-chlorotoluene) consist of a disubstituted benzene ring with one chlorine atom and one methyl group.

Properties 
The isomers differ in the location of the chlorine, but have the same chemical formula. All have very similar boiling points, although p-chlorotoluene has a much higher melting point due to a more tightly packed crystal structure.

Benzyl chloride is an isomer, which has a chlorine substituted for one of the hydrogens of toluene's methyl group, and it is sometimes named α-chlorotoluene.

Preparation
A laboratory route to 2- and 4-chlorotoluene proceeds from 2- and 4-toluidines (i.e. 2- and 4-aminotoluene).  These compounds are diazotized followed by treatment with cuprous chloride.  Industrially, the diazonium method is reserved for 3-chlorotoluene. The industrial route to 2- and 4-chlorotoluene entails direct reaction of toluene with chlorine.  The more valuable 4-chlorotoluene is separated from 2-chlorotoluene by distillation.  Distillation cannot be applied to separating 3-chlorotoluene from 4-chlorotoluene.

Uses
2- and 4-chlorotoluene are precursors to the corresponding benzyl chloride (ClC6H4CH2Cl), benzaldehyde (ClC6H4CHO), and benzoyl chloride (ClC6H4C(O)Cl). 2- and 4-chlorotoluenes are converted to 2-chlorobenzonitrile and 4-chlorobenzonitrile, respectively.

See also
Bromotoluene
Iodotoluene

References

 CDC - NIOSH Pocket Guide to Chemical Hazards - o-Chlorotoluene

Chlorobenzenes
Alkyl-substituted benzenes
Multiple compounds, tabular